Young, Broke & Beautiful is an American travel documentary television series that debuted on IFC on June 24, 2011. It stars travel guide Broke-ass Stuart touring major American cities on a low budget.

References

External links
 Young, Broke & Beautiful at IFC
 

2010s American documentary television series
2011 American television series debuts
American travel television series
IFC (American TV channel) original programming